Edison High School may refer to:

Thomas A. Edison High School (Queens), Jamaica, Queens
Thomas A. Edison High School (Elmira Heights), Elmira Heights, New York
Thomas A. Edison High School (Oregon), Portland, Oregon
Thomas A. Edison High School (Pennsylvania), Philadelphia, Pennsylvania
Thomas A. Edison High School (Fairfax County, Virginia), Alexandria, Virginia
Thomas A. Edison Junior-Senior High School, Lake Station, Indiana
Edison High School (Fresno, California), Fresno, California
Edison High School (Huntington Beach, California), Huntington Beach, California
Edison High School (Stockton, California), Stockton, California
Edison High School (Minnesota), Minneapolis, Minnesota
Edison High School (New Jersey), Edison, New Jersey
Edison High School (Milan, Ohio), Milan, Ohio
Edison High School (Richmond, Ohio), Richmond, Ohio
Edison High School (Portland, Oregon), not to be confused with the unrelated Thomas A. Edison High School in Portland, Oregon
Edison High School (San Antonio), Texas
Edison Junior-Senior High School, Yoder, Colorado
Burlington-Edison High School, Burlington, Washington
Miami Edison High School, Miami, Florida
Edison Preparatory School, Tulsa, Oklahoma
Thomas Edison High School of Technology, Silver Spring, Maryland
Edison Regional Gifted Center, Chicago, Illinois